The Consultative Assembly (also known as the Shura Council) is the legislative body of the State of Qatar, with 45 members. Following the 2021 Qatari general election, it has 30 elected members and 15 appointed members. The body can only question the prime minister, who is appointed by the Emir of Qatar, on his policies if two-thirds of the members agree, which is unlikely given that one-third of the members are appointed by the Emir.

Constitutional role 
The Council was formed in April 1972 with 20 appointed members. In May 1972, the first consultative assembly meeting was held, during which Sayed Aziz bin Khalid Al Ghanim was elected as the assembly's first chairman. Aside from the 20 members who took part in the meeting, Sheikh Khalifa bin Hamad Al Thani and foreign dignitaries were also in attendance.

Qatar's constitution, approved in April 2003 by popular referendum, has created a legislative body to be two thirds elected by universal suffrage, and one third appointed by the Emir. According to the constitution, the legislature will have three powers: to approve (but not prepare) the national budget; to monitor the performance of ministers through no-confidence votes; and to draft, discuss, and vote on proposed legislation, which becomes law only with the vote of a two-thirds majority and the Emir's endorsement.

The consultative assembly has the following functions:

 Legislative authority
 Approves the general budget of the government
 Exercises control over the executive authority
 The assembly has the right to forward proposals on public matters to the government. If the government doesn't comply with the proposal it has to give its reasons and the assembly can comment on them

Members 
The current Chairman of the Consultative Assembly is Hassan bin Abdullah Al-Ghanim.

|-
! style="background-color:#E9E9E9;text-align:left;vertical-align:top;" width=350|Members
! style="background-color:#E9E9E9;text-align:right;" |Seats
|-
| style="text-align:left;" |Elected members
|30
|-
| style="text-align:left;" |Appointed members
|15
|-
|style="text-align:left;background-color:#E9E9E9"|Total
|width="30" style="text-align:right;background-color:#E9E9E9"|45
|}
Speaker
Hassan bin Abdullah Al-Ghanim (elected member)

Deputy speaker
 Hamda bint Hassan Al-Sulaiti (appointed member)

Rapporteurs
Hadi bin Saeed al-Khayarin
Rashid bin Hamad al-Meadadi

Elected members

 Fareej Khulaifat: Abd Ul-Rahman bin Yousuf Al-Khulaifi
 Fareej Alhitmi: Ahmad bin Hitmi AL-Hitmi
 Fareek Aslata: Abdulla bin Ali Al-Sulaiti
 Almirqab: Essa bin Ahmad Al-Nassr
 Fareej Old Ghanim: Hassan bin Abdulla Al-Ghanim
 Musherib: Khalid bin Ghanim Al-Maadheed
 Aljisra: Khalid bin Ahmed Al-Obaidan
 Albidaa: Nasser bin Salmine Alsuwaidi
 Braha Aljuferi: Hamad bin Abdulla Al-Mulla
 Doha Aljadeed: 	Khalid bin Abas Kamal Al-Emadi
 Rawdat Alkheil: Nasser bin Mohsin Bukshaisha
 Rumailah: Essa bin Arar Alromaihi
 Fareej Alnajada: Mohamed bin Yousef Abudelrahman Almana
 North Wakra: Mohamed bin Muftah Al-Muftah
 South Wakra: Yousef bin Ali Al-Khater
 Seliah: Ali bin Fetais Almarri
 Old Rayan: Mohamed bin Batti Al-Abdulla
 Khureitiat: Ali bin Shabib Al-Attiya
 Thaain:	Nasser bin Metrif Issa Al-hemeidi
 Khour Thakhira:	Ahmed bin Hamad Almohanadi
 Musheirib: Mohammed bin Eid Al-Kaabi
 Alghariya: Mubarak bin Mohamed Al-Kuwari
 Roues: Yousef bin Ahmed Al-Sada
 Aba Altholouf:	Mohammed bin Omar Al-Mannai
 Ljamil: Nasser bin Hassan Alkubaisi
 Lghwadrieh: Nasser bin Mohd Al-Naimi
 Alnisranieh Lkhuraib: Sultan bin Hassan Aldosari
 Dukhan: Mubarak Bin Saif Al-Mansouri
 Al Kharsaah, Ummahat Sawi and Al Owaina: Ali bin Said Al-Khayareen
 Rawdat Rashid: Salem bin Rashid Al-Meraikhi

Appointed members 

 Yousef Ahmed Ali Omran Al Kuwari
 Saad Ahmed bin Mohammed Al-Ibrahim Al Muhannadi
 Badi Ali Mohammed Al-Badi
 Mohammed Fahad bin Mohammed Al-Muslim
 Muhammad Mahdi Ajyan Al-Ahbabi
 Sheikha Yousef Al-Jufairi (f)
 Ahmed Ibrahim Rashid Al-Maliki
 Saud Jassim Mohammed Al Buainain
 Saad Ahmed Abdullah Al-Misnad
 Muhammad Mansour Khalil Al Khalil Al-Shahwani
 Ahmed Sultan Muhammad Sabah Al-Asiri
 Abdullah Jaber Muhammad Libdeh
 Abdullah Nasser Turki Al-Subaie
 Umair Abdullah Khalid Aljabr Al-Nuaimi

Chairmen

History 
In 2006 it was announced that legislative elections would take place in 2007; according to a 1 April statement by then-First Deputy Premier and Foreign Minister Hamad bin Jassim bin Jaber Al Thani, who later became Prime Minister of Qatar. That was postponed and an advisory committee was established to study the issue. The legislative council rescheduled the elections for June 2010. The election did not take place in 2010.

In November 2011, the Emir announced that the election would take place in 2013, but they were postponed prior to the retiring Emir Hamad bin Khalifa Al Thani transferring power to his son Tamim bin Hamad Al Thani. The Consultative Assembly's term was extended until 2016.

In November 2017, Emir Tamim bin Hamad Al Thani appointed four women to the 45-member council, marking the first time women have taken part in the council.

However, the elections were then postponed until 2019, with the prior term extended once again. In October 2019 the Emir issued an order for a committee to be formed to organise the elections, chaired by Prime Minister Khalid bin Khalifa bin Abdul Aziz Al Thani. In November 2020, the Emir pledged to hold the elections in October 2021. The 2021 Qatari general election was held on 2 October 2021.

See also

Politics of Qatar
List of legislatures by country

References

1972 establishments in Qatar
Qatar
Politics of Qatar
Political organisations based in Qatar
Qatar